The candango mouse or candango akodont (Juscelinomys candango) is an extinct rodent species from South America. It was found around Brasilia in 1960, but its habitat has been overtaken by urban sprawl, and is now presumed extinct.

References

Animal Diversity Web

Juscelinomys
Mammals described in 1965